Luke Dean is the name of:

Luke Dean (footballer, born 1913), English professional footballer who played for Port Vale
Luke Dean (footballer, born 1991), English professional footballer who plays for Harrogate Town